The Lenox Hotel is a historic building located in Lenox, Iowa, United States. The original Lenox hotel had been built in 1874, and was destroyed in a fire in 1912. Local businessmen formed the Lenox Hotel Company to construct a new building in its place. Vern Dunlap was the general contractor who built the new hotel, which was completed in 1916. An addition was built onto the back of the building sometime in the 1960s. The lower level commercial space housed the White Way Cafe from 1942 until it closed in 1979. The building was listed on the National Register of Historic Places in 2002. The Lenox hotel is a three-story brick structure with a prominent front porch.

References

Commercial buildings completed in 1916
Buildings and structures in Taylor County, Iowa
Hotel buildings on the National Register of Historic Places in Iowa
Hotels in Iowa
National Register of Historic Places in Taylor County, Iowa